Pervy TVCh, JSC (First HDTV) is the Russian TV company established in 2007 in Saint Petersburg.

The audience of Pervy TVCh channels includes over 43 million people all across Russia (as of February 2020). 

Pervy TVCh specializes in creating niche TV channels for satellite and cable broadcasting. Pervy TVCh produces thematic channels including HDTV.

The TV company was one of the pioneers in Russia to launch timeshift satellite TV channels.

History of the Company
April 27, 2007 — broadcasting of the first TV channels such as Teleputeshestviya (‘Teletravel’), Veseloye TV (‘Merry TV’) and Raketa TV (‘Rocket TV’) began.
Autumn 2007 — launch of new channels: Nochnoy Klub (‘Night Club’, erotica), Zoo TV and Kinopokaz (‘Screening’).
August 2008 — debut of Kinopokaz HD-1 to broadcast in high definition with the Dolby Digital sound.
September 2008 — rebranding of the children’s channel Raketa TV to start broadcasting the first Russian Teen TV channel for teenagers.
Summer 2009 — expansion of the HD channels family: Kinopokaz HD-1, Kinopokaz HD-2, Teleputeshestviya HD, High Life HD.
Autumn 2009 — the company concluded the contract with BBC, The Walt Disney Company, 20 Century Fox and Metro-Goldwyn-Mayer (MGM), which allowed diversifying the air for Teleputeshestviya HD and film channels.
December 1, 2009 — Veseloye TV was renamed as Okhotnik i Rybolov (‘Hunters and Fishermen’).
Spring 2010 — contracts for screening were concluded with Home Box Office (HBO), NBC Universal (NBCU) and Paramount Pictures Corporation.
June 2010 — Zagorodny (Country Channel) and Diskoteka TV (‘Disco TV’) started broadcasting in a test mode.
Summer 2011 — launch of a new erotic channel Iskusheniye HD (‘Temptation HD’).
December 2011 — launch of TV Mir (‘TV World’).
January 1, 2012 — closing of High Life HD TV channel.
June 1, 2012 — closing of Diskoteka TV channel.
December 12, 2012 — launch of Okhotnik i Rybolov HD, a new TV channel for men in a high definition format.
August 1, 2013 — closing of Look TV channel.
October 1, 2013 — rebranding of Teleputeshestviya HD with a name change for Teletravel HD and a change of the concept to focus the channel on programs about extreme travelling and sports.
July 1, 2014 — the launch of a new high definition TV channels: the educational channel Eureka HD and Animal Family HD, a family TV channel about wildlife.
June 1, 2015 — the launch of new children’s TV channels: Ryzhiy (‘Ginger’) (replaced Teen TV) and Ryzhiy HD (‘Ginger HD’).
November 15, 2015 — broadcasting of Insight UHD, an ultra-high-definition TV channel (4K UHDTV), started.
February 1, 2017 — the launch of Multik (‘Cartoon’), a new children’s high definition TV channel.
December 1, 2017 — rebranding of Teletravel HD into Priklyucheniya HD (‘Adventures HD’) and Eureka HD into Evrika HD (Cyrillic spelling)
December 20, 2017 — rebranding of Animal Family, an educational Russian TV channel, into V Mire Zhivotnykh (‘In the World of Animals’).
March 1, 2018 — rebranding of entertainment TV channel Tonus into Zdorovye (‘Health’).
April 25, 2018 — closing of erotic channels Nochnoy Klub and Iskusheniye HD.
May 2018 — distribution of meditative TV channels about the nature of Siberia: Nasha Sibir (‘Our Siberia’) and Nasha Sibir 4K (‘Our Siberia 4K’) started.
June 1, 2018 — rebranding of Zoo TV into Zoo TV with Cyrillic spelling.
September 1, 2018 — rebranding of Teleputeshestviya. A new logo and corporate style were designed by Artemiy Lebedev Studio.
April 1, 2019 — the launch of Mir Vokrug (‘World Around’), an online TV channel on the platform of Yandex.Efir.
June 1, 2019 — rebranding of Ginger HD TV Channel into Kapitan Fantastika (‘Capitan Fantastic’). Kapitan Fantastika became the first children’s adventure TV channel in Russia.
December 31, 2019 — closing of Multik TV Channel. 
January 1, 2020 — launch of Arsenal, an educational military TV channel.
February, 2020 — distribution of eight film TV channels started: Nash Kinopokaz (‘Our Screening’), Blokbaster (‘Blockbuster’), Nashe Muzhskoye (‘Man-to-Man’), Pro Lyubov (‘About Love’), Hit, Kamedi (‘Comedy’), Taina (‘Mystery’), Siesta.
April 6, 2020 — rebranding of Okhotnik i Rybolov (‘Hunter and Fishermen’) channel into Rybolov (‘Fishermen’).
April 6, 2020 — rebranding of Okhotnik i Rybolov HD (‘Hunter and Fishermen HD’) channel into Okhotnik i Rybolov (‘Hunter and Fishermen’).

TV Channels

The Company’s Own TV Channels 

 Zagorodny
 Teleputeshestviya
 Rybolov
 Okhotnik i Rybolov 
 V Mire Zhivotnykh
 Zoo TV
 Priklyucheniya HD
 Zdorovye
 Ryzhiy
 Kapitan Fantastika
 Evrika
 Arsenal

TV Channels for Distribution 

 Insight UHD
 Nasha Sibir
 Nasha Sibir 4K
 Kinopokaz
 Nash Kinopokaz
 Blokbaster
 Nashe Muzhskoye
 Pro Lyubov 
 Hit
 Kamedi
 Taina
 Siesta

Broadcasting

 Tricolor TV provides broadcasting of SDTV and HDTV channels on the European territory of Russia through Eutelsat 36A and Eutelsat 36B (36°E) satellites, as well as in Siberia and a part of the Far East through the Express АТ-1 satellite (56°E).
 Through cable network of commercial transmission system operators.
 Through the M9 land exchange point.
 Through IP networks.

Projects by the TV Company 

Peremotka (‘Film Rewind’) Festival. The organizer is Pervy TVCh, Kinopokaz channel. The Film Rewind Festival gathers together young short-length film directors. The winner of the Festival receives the grant to fulfill their creative potential. The first festival took place on June 17, 2011 in Saint Petersburg.
Mechta o puteshestvii ‘Dream about the Journey’ Project. The organizer is Pervy TVCh, Teleputeshestviya channel. Viewers of the TV channel invent an unusual route for the expedition, the winner receives a money prize to make a dream about their journey come true.
Smotri Na Menya (‘Look at Me’) Festival. The organizer is Pervy TVCh, Teen TV channel. A creative contest for teenagers took place from May 2009 to December 2010 in 12 Russian cities. The final round of the festival took place in Saint Petersburg on December 16–18, 2010. The winner received a grant.
Okhotnik i Rybolov TV Channel Cup. Fishing contests and a family festival. Held 3 times a year since 2012: summer and winter fishing cups and a hunting cup. The annual prize fund of the Cup is RUB 1,000,000.

Prizes and Awards

Bolshaya Tsifra (‘Big Digit’) Award 

 2010 — Teleputeshestviya TV channel. Category ‘New Russian TV’, nomination ‘HD Channel’
 2011 — Kinopokaz TV channel. People's Choice Award in the nomination ‘Film Channel’
 2011 — Kinopokaz HD-2 TV channel. People's Choice Award in the nomination ‘HD Channel’
 2012 — Teleputeshestviya HD TV channel. People's Choice Award in the nomination ‘HD Channel’
 2012 — Kinopokaz TV channel. People's Choice Award in the nomination ‘Film Channel’
 2013 — Teen TV channel. People's Choice Award in the nomination ‘Entertainment Channel’
 2014 — Teletravel HD TV channel. People's Choice Award in the nomination ‘TV Channel about Traveling’
 2015 — Animal Family HD TV channel. People's Choice Award in the nomination ‘Best TV Channel for Family Viewing’
 2019 — Okhotnik i Rybolov TV Channel Cup. Winner in the nomination ‘Best Event Organized by the Channel for Its Viewers’
 2020 — ‘Six Senses. Saint Petersburg’ Project by Evrika TV channel. The Bolshaya Tsifra (‘Big Digit’) Award in the nomination ‘Documentary-educational Program’

Other Awards 

 The 12th Moscow International Film Festival ‘Vertical’
 Festival of Children’s Television ‘Join In’
 Kitovras — the International Festival of Tourist Films
 Eureka HD — the Zolotoy Luch (‘Golden Ray’) Award-2014 in the nomination ‘Best HD Channel’
 Ryzhiy — the Zolotoy Luch (‘Golden Ray’) Award-2015 in the nomination ‘Children’s TV Channel’
 Teleputeshestviya — the STRANA Award for the ‘Pronina’s Route’ Project in the nomination ‘Big Country’ 

Russian companies established in 2007
Telecommunications companies of Russia
Television production companies of Russia
Mass media in Saint Petersburg
Companies based in Saint Petersburg